Fabien Poulin (January 3, 1928 – March 7, 2005) was a Canadian provincial politician and physician. He was the Liberal member of the Legislative Assembly of Quebec for Beauce from 1960 to 1962. He was also mayor of Lac-Poulin, Quebec from 1963 to 1964.

References

1928 births
2005 deaths
Mayors of places in Quebec
People from Chaudière-Appalaches
Quebec Liberal Party MNAs